Loftet is a mountain in Lom Municipality in Innlandet county, Norway. The mountain is surrounded by several other notable mountains including Galdhøpiggen to the east; Skagsnebb and Sauhøi to the southeast; Storbreahøe to the south; and Veslfjelltinden, Veslbreatinden, and Storbreatinden to the south.

See also
List of mountains of Norway by height

References

Jotunheimen
Lom, Norway
Mountains of Innlandet